Remote Control (Icelandic: Sódóma Reykjavík  is a 1992 Icelandic film directed by Óskar Jónasson in his feature-length directorial debut. The plot is a farce, revolving around the young car mechanic Axel and his adventure in the Reykjavík underworld which starts when his mother insists that he must recover the remote control to her TV. It was screened in the Un Certain Regard section at the 1993 Cannes Film Festival.

The film stars Björn Jörundur Friðbjörnsson as Axel, and features the Icelandic metal band HAM.

Cast
 Björn Jörundur Friðbjörnsson – Axel
 Þórarinn Eyfjörð – Flosi
 Thorarinn Oskar Thorarinsson – Vigfús
 Helga Braga Jónsdóttir – Símastúlka
 Þóra Friðriksdóttir – Mamma
 Margrét Hugrún Gústavsdóttir – Mæja
 Sigurjón Kjartansson – Orri
 Soley Eliasdottir – Unnur
 Óttarr Proppé – Hrólfur
 Ari Matthíasson – Þorbjörn
 Erling Jóhannesson – Arnar
 Pétur Eggerz – Sveinn
 Helgi Björnsson – Moli
 Ólafur Guðmundsson – Árni
 Björn Karlsson – Höddi Feiti
 Rósa Guðný Þórsdóttir – Sonja 
 Guðný Helgadóttir – Katrín 
 Árni Pétur Guðjónsson – Viggó 
 Hjálmar Hjálmarsson – Hjörtur 
 Jóhann G. Jóhannsson – Garðar 
 Gígja Hilmarsdóttir – Daughter of Moli and Sonja 
 Eggert Þorleifsson – Aggi Flinki 
 Stefan St. Sigurjonsson – Brjánsi Sýra 
 Þröstur Guðbjartsson – Elli 
 Steinunn Ólafsdóttir – Afgreiðslustúlka 
 Skúli Gautason – Grímur 
 Björgúlfur Egilsson – Rótari 
 Björn Blöndal – Trommari 
 Flosi Þorgeirsson – Gítarleikari 
 Baldur Maríusson – Veiðimaður 
 Sólveig Stefánsdóttir – Barn 
 Ingólfur Þór Guðmundsson –  Barn 
 Þórir Steingrímsson – Hallvarður 
 Þröstur Leó Gunnarsson – Áslákur

References

External links

1992 films
1992 comedy films
1992 directorial debut films
1990s Icelandic-language films
Films directed by Óskar Jónasson
Icelandic comedy films